North 24 Parganas district with 24.22% Muslims (in 2001) has been identified as a minority concentrated district by the Ministry of Minority Affairs, Government of India. 11 districts in West Bengal has been identified as minority concentrated districts, all in Muslim minority category: Murshidabad, Malda, Uttar Dinajpur, Dakshin Dinajpur, Birbhum, Nadia, Bardhaman, Howrah, North 24 Parganas, South 24 Parganas and Cooch Behar. After these districts were identified Bardhaman district has been bifurcated into Purba Bardhaman district and Paschim Bardhaman district.

Religion in North 24 Parganas
Given below is an overview of the religion-wise break-up of the population across the subdivisions of North 24 Parganas district, as per 2011 census:

Survey
A baseline survey on religious minority population has been carried out under the aegis of Indian Council of Social Science Research and funded by the Ministry of Minority Affairs. The survey has covered 90 districts in the country. It was carried out on the basis of religion specific socio-economic indicators and basic amenities indicators respectively. The four religion specific socio-economic indicators were: literacy rate, female literacy rate, work participation rate and female work participation rate. The four basic amenities were: percentage of households with pucca walls, percentage of households with safe drinking water, percentage of households with electricity and percentage of households with W/C latrines. 53 districts having both sets of indicators below national average were placed in group ‘A’. The remaining 37 districts with either of the indicator values below national average were placed in group ‘B’. Group B was further divided into two sub-groups – B1 for which religion specific socio-economic indicators were below national average and B2 for which basic amenities indicators were below national average. North 24 Parganas was placed in group B (sub-category B1). The district averages for North 24 Parganas performed poorly for female work participation followed by electrified houses, houses with pucca walls and work participation. In all other parameters the district averages were higher than the corresponding national averages.

The survey report, unfortunately, is not dated, but from the data it uses, it can be identified to have been carried out after 2004 and before 2011. Some highlights from the survey follow.

83.55% Muslim households on an average had in-house toilet facilities compared to 87.43% for non-Muslim households. However, there was a wide variation across villages. 49.74% Muslim households were electrified compared to 57.82 non-Muslim households. 76.80% Muslim household used wood as primary fuel compared to 69.69% non-Muslim households. Most Muslim or non-Muslim households had access to private/ public hand pumps or tube wells. Usage of tap water was slightly higher for non-Muslims (9.63%) than Muslims (6.72%). In general, the district was well placed in respect of safe drinking water. The average distance traversed for procurement of water was not much and in fact well within half a kilometer for both Muslims and non-Muslims.

Majority of the villages had kutcha houses and 98.7% of Muslim and 96.2% of non-Muslim households owned their houses. Housing condition appeared by and large similar for the Muslim households as compared to non-Muslims, as on average 45.26% of Muslim compared to 44.05% of non-Muslim houses lived in kutcha houses, 37.37% of Muslims and 28.18% of non-Muslims lived in kutcha-pucca houses. Across villages in North 24 Parganas, 16.58% Muslims owned puuca houses, as against 25.89% non-Muslims owning pucca houses.

Of the many glaring facts, one should begin with the level of illiteracy among Muslim households that stood at 23.1% for the male and 24.86% for the female. Of the rest of the Muslims who were deemed literate, the percentage of below primary educated male was 25.66 and female was 24.29. The percentage steadily dwindled as one went higher up beyond primary level till the secondary level (Male 4.13% and Female 4.88%). The situation was not appreciably better for non-Muslim households, where literacy level was definitely higher, but secondary school going percentage for male was 8.96 and female was 6.48. Among the Muslims 1.82% males and 0.68% females were graduates, compared to 4.90% for males and 2.28% for females among non-Muslims. Despite the fact that distance wise, most Muslim (65.91%) and non-Muslims (59%) households found the school almost in the neighbourhood within a distance of 1 km, continuation of education at school level became infeasible at a very early stage owing to the high opportunity cost of being in school. The next best alternative to attending school was to go out for work and earn for the family. The survey opined that mid-day meal alone could not address the problem of high rate of school drop-out.

The survey found that people were more dependent on government health centres or hospitals for availing health facilities. However, both the communities also went to the quacks. It was often the case that sub-PHCs were not available within respective panchayats. The consequence of this inaccessibility was strongly reflected in the high average incidence of childbirth at home (61.78% of Muslim households and 29.73% of non-Muslim households) with the help of sometimes trained but largely untrained midwives. The vaccination programmes had run rather successfully and over 80 percent of families, over the religious divide, were covered. In fact, the Muslim community projected no less participation compared to other communities. Regarding vaccination of children under the age of five, over 80 per cent of all communities had been covered, while those who did not participate in the programme, were mainly owing to lack of awareness.

It may be mentioned that the success of government sponsored development schemes strongly depend on the level of awareness and hence the participation in using such facilities. The popularity of the NREGS with ready source of income and cash flow seemed to receive the highest attention despite longer-term benefits associated with many other schemes already in operation. Even in the case of NREGS, across communities over 80% were aware about the NREGS but a moderate section of that (around 30%) had benefited. Around 53.8% of the villages had commercial banks and 63.16% had agricultural credit societies within 5 km while percentage of co-operative banks within 5 km was 21.43%. The level of indebtedness was high among both communities, exceeding 35% of the households surveyed. There was clear indication that the source was still the traditional moneylenders charging high rates of interest and more than one-third of respondents in either community had used this source at some point. Of the families surveyed around a third of both the Muslims and non-Muslims had BPL ration cards. More than 65% of the Muslims and over 60% of the non-Muslims reported the public distribution system to be inefficient, either in terms of inadequacy, inferior quality, less in amount, irregularity and so on.

References

Minority concentrated districts in West Bengal